Lieutenant Christopher Sydney Hudson (1 August 1910 – 7 April 2005) was a British alpine skier. He competed in the men's combined event at the 1936 Winter Olympics. During World War II, Hudson was also part of the Special Operations Executive (SOE).

Biography
Hudson was born in Royal Tunbridge Wells, Kent, in 1910, but spent most of his early life in near Montreux, Switzerland. As well as skiing, Hudson also played golf and tennis. He would spend the winter skiing in Switzerland, while playing at the Royal Eastbourne Golf Club in England in the warmer months. As a golfer, he was a three-time runner-up in the Sussex Amateur Championship during the 1930s, and in 1932, he reached the fifth round of the British Open Amateur Championship. As a skier, he competed against Peter Lunn, who would also represent Great Britain at the Winter Olympics. Lunn, like Hudson, was also a spy.

In 1933, Hudson became the British champion, and was named the vice-captain of the British Olympic team. At the 1936 Winter Olympics in Garmisch-Partenkirchen, Germany, Hudson competed in the men's combined event, where he finished in 29th place.

After the Olympics, Hudson joined the Royal Fusiliers. From there, he joined the Special Operations Executive, and he began to work with the French Resistance. While in France, he was arrested, and spent 15 months in captivity. He managed to escape, via Spain, and get back to England, before returning back to France. He was honoured with a Distinguished Service Order and the Croix de Guerre.

In the 1950s, Hudson worked for Shell International, before returning to Scotland at the end of the 1960s to work for the Bank of Scotland. He also worked for the Confederation of British Industry (CBI), and became a chairman of CBI Scotland. He also helped to establish the Social Democratic Party in Scotland in the early 1980s. In 2003, Hudson wrote the book Undercover Operator about his time in the SOE. He died in Livingston, West Lothian, Scotland, in April 2005 at the age of 94.

References

External links
 

1910 births
2005 deaths
British male alpine skiers
Olympic alpine skiers of Great Britain
Alpine skiers at the 1936 Winter Olympics
People from Royal Tunbridge Wells